Gaudiya Vaishnavism, also known as  Chaitanya Vaishnavism, is a Vaishnava Hindu religious movement inspired by Chaitanya Mahaprabhu (1486–1534) in India. "Gaudiya" refers to the Gaura or Gauḍa region of Bengal, with Vaishnavism meaning "the worship of Vishnu". Specifically, it is part of Krishnaism—Krishna-centric Vaishnavite traditions. 

Its theological basis is primarily that of the Bhagavad Gita and Bhagavata Purana (known within the tradition as the Srimad Bhagavatam), as interpreted by early followers of Chaitanya, such as Sanatana Goswami, Rupa Goswami, Jiva Goswami, Gopala Bhatta Goswami and others.

The focus of Gaudiya Vaishnavism is the devotional worship (known as bhakti yoga) of Radha and Krishna, and their many divine incarnations as the supreme forms of God, Svayam Bhagavan. Most popularly, this worship takes the form of singing Radha and Krishna's holy names, such as "Hare", "Krishna" and "Rama", most commonly in the form of the Hare Krishna (mantra), also known as kirtan and dancing along with it.

Gaudiya Vaishnavism is the spiritual and philosophical foundation of the well-known International Society for Krishna Consciousness,  "Hare Krishna Movement".

Philosophical concepts

Living beings
According to Gaudiya Vaishnava philosophy, consciousness is not a product of matter, but is instead a symptom of the soul. All living beings (jivas), including animals and trees, have a soul. That soul is distinct from their current physical body – the nature of the soul being eternal, immutable, and indestructible without any particular birth or death. The soul does not die when the body dies, but it is transmigrated into another new body and takes new birth in a new body. Souls which are captivated by the illusory nature of the world (Maya) are repeatedly reborn among the various 8.4 million number of species of life on this planet and in other worlds in accordance to the laws of karma and individual desire. This is consistent with the concept of samsara found in Hindu, Sikh and Buddhist beliefs.

Release from the process of samsara (known as moksha) is believed to be achievable through a variety of spiritual practices. However, within Gaudiya Vaishnavism, it is bhakti in its purest state (or "pure love of God") which is given as the ultimate aim, rather than liberation from the cycle of rebirth. Gaudiya Vaishnav tradition asserts that in the current yuga, which is Kali Yuga, singing and chanting the various sacred names of God are sufficient for spiritual liberation.

Supreme Person (God)

One of the defining aspects of Gaudiya Vaishnavism is that Shri Krishna is worshiped specifically as the source of all Avataric incarnations of God. This is based on quotations from the Bhagavata Purana, such as "krsnastu bhagavan svayam", literally "Krishna is God Himself".

Inconceivable oneness and difference

A particularly distinct part of the Gaudiya Vaishnava philosophy espoused by Chaitanya Mahaprabhu is the concept of Achintya Bheda Abheda, which translates to "inconceivable oneness and difference" in the context of the soul's relationship with Krishna, and also Krishna's relationship with his other energies (i.e. the material world).

In quality, the soul (jiva) is described as being identical to God, but in terms of quantity, individual jivas are said to be infinitesimal in comparison to the unlimited Supreme Being. The exact nature of this relationship (being simultaneously one and different with Krishna) is inconceivable to the human mind but can be experienced through the process of Bhakti yoga.

This philosophy serves as a meeting of two opposing schools of Hindu philosophy, pure monism (God and the soul as one entity) and pure dualism (God and the soul as absolutely separate). This philosophy largely recapitulates the concepts of qualified nondualism practiced by the older Vedantic school Vishishtadvaita, but emphasizes the figure of Krishna over Narayana and holy sites in and around Bengal over sites in Tamil Nadu. In practice, Gaudiya Vaishnava philosophy has much more in common with the dualistic schools especially closely following theological traditions established by Madhvacharya's Dvaita Vedanta.

Devotional activities

Bhakti Yoga

The practical process of devotional life is described as bhakti or bhakti-yoga. The two main elements of the bhakti-yoga process are vaidhi bhakti, which is devotional service through practice of rules and regulations (sadhana) and raganuga bhakti, which is taken as a higher stage of more spontaneous devotional service based on a selfless desire to please one's chosen Ishta-deva of Krishna or his associated expansions and avatars. Practicing vaidhi-bhakti with a view to cultivate prema creates eligibility for raganuga-sadhana. Both vaidhi and raganuga bhakti are based on the chanting or singing of Krishna's names. Attainment of the raganuga stage means that rules of lifestyle are no longer important and that emotions or any material activities for Krishna should not be repressed. Vaidhi-bhakti's purpose is to elevate the devotee to raganuga; something which generally takes a long time.

Within his Siksastaka prayers, Chaitanya compares the process of bhakti-yoga to that of cleansing a dirty place of dust, wherein our consciousness is the object in need of purification. This purification takes place largely through the chanting and singing of Radha and Krishna's names. Specifically, the Hare Krishna (mantra) is chanted and sung by practitioners on a daily basis, sometimes for many hours each day. Famously within the tradition, one of Chaitanya Mahaprabhu's close associates, Haridasa Thakur, is reported to have chanted 300,000 holy names of God each day.

Diet and lifestyle
Gaudiya Vaishnavas follow a lacto vegetarian diet, abstaining from all types of animal flesh, fish and eggs. Onion and garlic are also avoided as they are believed to promote tamasic form of consciousness in the eater. Some Gaudiya Vaishnavas, mainly from ISKCON and Gaudiya Matha, also avoid the intake of caffeine, as they believe it is addictive and an intoxicant.

Sampradaya and parampara
A Guru—shishya tradition ("lineage") denotes a succession of teachers and disciples within some sampradaya (school, tradition). In accordance with the tradition, Gaudiya Vaishnavism as a subschool belongs to the Brahma Sampradaya, one of the four "orthodox" Vaishnavite schools. Chaitanya Mahaprabhu is said to be a disciple of Isvara Puri who was a disciple of Madhavendra Puri who was a disciple of Lakshmipati Tirtha who was a disciple of Vyasatirtha (1469–1539) of the Madhva Sampradaya. The Gaudiya Vaishnavas call their tradition "Brahma-Madhva-Gaudiya Sampradaya", which originates from Brahma and has Madhvacharya as the original acharya and Chaitanya Mahaprabhu as the acharya-successor.

However, this traditional point is at least debatable. Some modern scholars and confessional authors critically assess and pair the Gaudiya Vaishnavism's affiliation with the Madhva tradition. For example, the famous American Indologist and historian of religion Guy L. Beck, with regard to the Chaitanya Sampradaya, notes the following historical events. The first time the Brahma-Madhva affiliation of Gaudiya Vaishnavism was propounded by Baladeva Vidyabhushana was in the 18th century. And to this day, there is no mention of Chaitanya in the annals of the Madhva Sampradaya. For secular scientists this means, originality and non-affiliation of Gaudiya Vaishnavism with other previous branches. At the same time, there is the consensus of scholars, that Chaitanya was initiated by the two gurus of a Vaishnava-oriented group within Adi Shankara's Dashanami order.

The Prameya Ratnawali of the above-mentioned gaudiya-acharya Baladeva Vidyabhushana contains the following canonical list of disciplic succession: Krishna, Brahma, Narada, Vyasa, Madhva, Padmanabha, Nrihari, Madhava, Akshobhya, Jayatirtha, Gyanasindhu, Dayanidhi, Vidyanidhi, Rajendra, Jayadharma, Purushottama, Brahmanya, Vyasatirtha, Lakshmipati Tirtha, Madhavendra Puri, Isvara Puri, and Chaitanya. 

One feature of the Gaudiya succession of spiritual masters should be considered. Chaitanya refused to formally initiate anyone as a disciple, only inspiring and guiding his followers. Chaitanya neither founded the community nor named a successor. That is why, from the very beginning, the sampradaya was divided into several lines of succession that were practically not connected with each other and that still exist today. One of them, namely, the Gaudiya-Sarasvata Sampradaya, belongs to the well known International Society for Krishna Consciousness.

History

Lord Chaitanya Mahaprabhu
Chaitanya Mahaprabhu (also transliterated Caitanya, IAST ; 1486–1534) was a Bengali spiritual teacher who founded Gaudiya Vaishnavism. He is believed by his devotees to be Krishna himself who appeared in the form of His own devotee in order to teach the people of this world the process of Bhakti and how to attain the perfection of life. This they say with several evidences in scripture. Lord Chaitanya Mahaprabhu is said to be a disciple of Isvara Puri who was a disciple of Madhavendra Puri who was a disciple of Lakshmipati Tirtha who was a disciple of Vyasatirtha(1469–1539) of Madhvacharya's Sampradaya. He is considered as the most merciful manifestation of Krishna. Lord Chaitanya Mahaprabhu was the proponent for the Vaishnava school of Bhakti yoga (meaning loving devotion to God), based on Bhagavata Purana and Bhagavad Gita. Of various incarnations of Vishnu, he is revered as Krishna, popularised the chanting of the Hare Krishna mantra and composed the Siksastakam (eight devotional prayers) in Sanskrit. His followers, Gaudiya Vaishnavas, revere him as a Krishna with the mood and complexion of his source of inspiration Radha.

Early growth
Over the three centuries following the disappearance of Sri Chaitanya Mahaprabhu, the Gaudiya Vaishnava tradition evolved into the form in which we largely find it today in contemporary India. In the early years of the tradition, the followers of Nityananda Prabhu, Advaita Acharya and other companions of Chaitanya Mahaprabhu educated and initiated people, each in their own locales across Bengal.

Chaitanya Mahaprabhu requested a select few among his followers, who later came to be known as the Six Gosvamis of Vrindavan, to systematically present his theology of bhakti in their writings. This theology emphasized the devotee's relationship to the Divine Couple, Radha and Krishna, and looked to Chaitanya as the embodiment of both Radha and Krishna. The six were Rupa Goswami, Sanatana Goswami, Gopala Bhatta Goswami, Raghunatha Bhatta Goswami, Raghunatha dasa Goswami and Jiva Goswami. In the second generation of the tradition, Narottama, Srinivasa and Shyamananda, three students of Jiva Goswami, the youngest among the six Goswamis, were instrumental in spreading the theology across Bengal and Orissa.

The festival of Kheturi (approx 1574), presided over by Jahnava Thakurani, the wife of Nityananda Rama, was the first time the leaders of the various branches of Chaitanya Mahaprabhu's followers assembled together. Through such festivals, members of the loosely organized tradition became acquainted with other branches along with their respective theological and practical nuances. That notwithstanding, the tradition has maintained its plural nature, having no central authority to preside over its matters. The festival of Kheturi allowed for the systemization of Gaudiya Vaishnava theology as a distinct branch of Vaishnava theology.

17th–18th century

During the 17th–18th centuries, there was a period of general decline in the movement's strength and popularity, its "lethargic state", characterized by decreased public preaching and the rise of persons following and promoting tantric teachings and practices. These groups are called apasampradayas by the Chaitanyaits.

In the 17th century, Vishvanath Chakravarti Thakur held great merit in clarifying core doctrinal issues over the practice of raganuga-bhakti through works such as Raga-vartma-chandrika. His student Baladeva Vidyabhushan wrote a famous commentary on the Vedanta-sutra called Govinda Bhashya.

The 18th century saw a number of luminaries headed by Siddha Jayakrishna Das Babaji of Kamyavan and Siddha Krishnadas Babaji of Govardhan. The latter, a widely renowned teacher of the mode of internal worship (raga-bhajan) practiced in the tradition, is largely responsible for the current form of devotional practice embraced by some of the traditions based in Vrindavan.

Manipuri Vaishnavism

The "Manipuri Vaishnavism" is a regional form of Gaudiya Vaishnavism with a culture-forming role among the Meitei people in the north-eastern Indian state of Manipur. There, after a short period of Ramaism penetration, Gaudiya Vaishnavism spread in the early 18th century, especially from beginning its second quarter. Raja Gharib Nawaz (Pamheiba) was initiated into the Chaitanya tradition. Most devotee ruler and propagandist of Gaudiya Vaishnavism, under the influence of Natottama Thakura's disciples, was raja Bhagyachandra, who has visited the holy for the Chaytanyaits Nabadwip. Rasa Lila dance became a feature of the regional folk and religious tradition.

20th century 

From the very beginning of Chaitanya's bhakti movement in Bengal, Haridasa Thakur and others Muslim by birth were the participants. This openness received a boost from Bhaktivinoda Thakur's broad-minded vision in the late 19th century, Baba Premananda Bharati's mission in the United States in the beginning of 20th century and was institutionalized by Bhaktisiddhanta Sarasvati Thakur in his Gaudiya Math in the 20th century.

A renaissance began at the start of the 20th century both in India and the West. One pioneer of the Gaudiya Vaishnavite mission in the West was Baba Premananda Bharati (1858–1914), author of Sree Krishna – the Lord of Love (1904) – the first full-length treatment of Gaudiya Vaishnavism in English, who, in 1902, founded the short-lived "Krishna Samaj" society in New York City and built a temple in Los Angeles. He belonged to the circle of adherents of the guru Prabhu Jagadbandhu with teachings similar to the later ISKCON mission. His followers formed several organizations including the now defunct Order of Living Service and the AUM Temple of Universal Truth.

The reform change of traditional caste Gaudiya Vaishnavism of 19th century is believed to have happened largely in India due to the efforts of a particularly adept preacher known as Bhaktivinoda Thakur, who also held the position of a deputy magistrate with the British government. Bhaktivinoda Thakur's son grew up to be both an eminent scholar and a highly influential Vaishnava preacher, and was later known as Bhaktisiddhanta Sarasvati. In 1920, Bhaktisiddhanta Sarasvati founded Gaudiya Math in India, and later sixty-four Gaudiya Matha monasteries in India, Burma and Europe. In 1933, the first European preaching center was established in London (London Glouster House, Cornwall Garden, W7 South Kensington) under the name "Gaudiya Mission Society of London".

Soon after Bhaktisiddhanta Sarasvati's death (1 January 1937), a dispute began, which divided the original Gaudiya Math mission into two administrative bodies still in existence today. In a settlement, they divided the sixty-four Gaudiya Math centers into two groups: the Sri Chaitanya Math headed by Bhakti Vilasa Tirtha Maharaj and the Gaudiya Mission headed by Ananta Vasudev (Bhakti Prasad Puri Maharaj).

Many of Bhaktisiddhanta Sarasvati's disciples disagreed with the spirit of these two factions and/or started their own missions to expand their guru's mission. In the 1960s, the one of his disciples, A. C. Bhaktivedanta Swami Prabhupada went to the West to spread Gaudiya-Vaishnavism and establish the International Society for Krishna Consciousness (ISKCON), "the most successful of the Gaudiya Math's offspring," an organization that continues today.

However, despite the active missionary work of the reformed Gaudiya Math and its followers, most of the Gaudiya Vaishnava community in India remained under the influence of hereditary brahmins-goswamis, who run famous old Gaudiya mandirs, as one example, the Radha Raman Temple in Vrindavan and its prominent scholar-acharya Shrivatsa Goswami.

Gaudiya and other Vaishnava schools
Although sharing a common set of core beliefs, there are a number of philosophical differences which distinguish Gaudiya Vaishnavism from other Vaishnava schools:
 In Gaudiya Vaishnavism, Krishna is seen as the original form of God, i.e. the source of Vishnu and not as His avatar. This is based primarily on verse 1.3.28 of the Bhagavata Purana (krsnas tu bhagavan svayam) and other scriptures. This belief is shared by the Nimbarka and Vallabha sampradayas, but not by the Ramanuja and Madhva schools, who view Krishna as an avatar of Vishnu.
 As Krishna's consort, Radha is similarly viewed as the source of all other Shaktis, including Lakshmi and Sita.
 Chaitanya Mahaprabhu is worshiped as the most recent i.e. ninth Avatar of Krishna to descend in the current yuga, or age. Other sampradayas view Chaitanya as a devotee of Krishna only, and not Krishna himself or a form of avatar. According to his biographies, Chaitanya did not display himself as Krishna in public, and would, in fact, avoid being addressed as such. In this regard A. C. Bhaktivedanta Swami states, "[When] addressed as Lord Krishna, He denied it. Indeed, He sometimes placed His hands over His ears, protesting that one should not be addressed as the Supreme Lord". However at times Chaitanya would exhibit a different mood and would welcome worship of himself as the Supreme Lord, and at a few occasions, is said to have exhibited his Universal form. Rupa Goswami, when first meeting with Chaitanya, composed the following verse showing his belief in Chaitanya Mahaprabhu's divinity:
"O most munificent incarnation! You are Krishna Himself appearing as Sri Krishna Caitanya Mahaprabhu. You have assumed the golden colour of Srimati Radharani, and You are widely distributing pure love of Krishna. We offer our respectful obeisances unto You." 

Although this viewpoint outside of the Gaudiya tradition was disputed, Chaitanya's followers prove it by pointing at verses throughout the Puranic literatures as evidence to support this claim. Evidences such as the Krishna-varnam verse SB 11.5.32 have many interpretations by scholars, including  Sridhara Svami who is accepted as authority by Mahaprabhu himself.

Theological sources
Gaudiya Vaishnava theology is prominently expounded by Jiva Goswami in his Sat-sandarbhas, six elaborate treatises on various aspects of God. Other prominent Gaudiya Vaishnava theologians are his uncles, Rupa Gosvami author of Sri Bhakti-rasamrta-sindhu and Sanatana Gosvami, author of Hari-bhakti-vilasa, Visvanatha Chakravarti author of Sri Camatkara-candrika and Baladeva Vidyabhushana, author of Govinda Bhashya, a famous commentary on Vedanta Sutra.

Modern Gaudiya Vaishnava societies
The strictly centralized form of church-type organization and the idea that one has to be an unconventional (uttama) spiritual master introduced by the reformer Bhaktisiddhanta Sarasvati and his Gaudiya Math was not characteristic of the traditional Gaudiya Vaishnavism with its hereditary brahmins-goswamis and family teachers (kula gurus). And much of the Gaudiya Vaishnava community in India remained committed to the unreformed and loosely organized tradition. Many modern organisations are independent branches of the tree of the Gaudiya Math.

 Gaudiya Math and offshoots
 Gaudiya Mission established by Ananta Vasudev Prabhu alias Srila Bhakti Prasad Puri (1940)
 Gaudiya Vedanta Samiti established by Bhakti Prajnan Keshava (1940)
 Sri Chaitanya Saraswat Math established by Bhakti Rakshak Sridhar (1941)
 International Society for Krishna Consciousness established by A. C. Bhaktivedanta Swami Prabhupada (1966)
 Science of Identity Foundation established by Siddhaswarupananda Paramahamsa (1977)
 Sri Sri Radha Govindaji Trust established by Bhakti Hridaya Bon (1979)
 Sri Caitanya Sangha, a.k.a. Gaudiya Vaishnavite Society, established by Tripurari Swami (1985)
 The Vaishnava Foundation, established by Kailasa Candra dasa & Eric Johanson (1986)
 ISKCON Revival Movement (2000)

 Traditional Gaudiya societies
 Sri Caitanya Prema Samsthana, established by Shrivatsa Goswami (1972)

Many of branches of the Gaudiya Math (not all) are members of the World Vaisnava Association — Visva Vaisnava Raj Sabha (WVA–VVRS), which had been established in 1994 by some Gaudiya leaders. But and after this establushment, there is little real cooperation among Gaudiya organisations.

Demography
There are adherents of Gaudiya Vaishnavism in all strata of Indian society, but a tendency has been revealed, Bengali Vaishnavas belong to the lower middle castes ("middle class"), while the upper castes as well as lowest castes and tribes in Bengal are Shaktas.

Offshoots of Gaudiya Vaishnavism
There are Krishnaite gurus and groups who belong to the Chaitanya lineage, but actually separated from Gaudiya Vaishnavism, becoming new independent movements.
 Mahanam Sampraday, inspired by Prabhu Jagadbandhu

See also
 108 names of Krishna
 Achintya Bheda Abheda
 Bhagavata
 Cataphatic theology
 Gaudiya Math
 List of 21st-century religious leaders#Gaudiya Vaishnavism
 Manipuri Vaishnavism
 Turiya

References

Notes

Footnotes

Bibliography

External links

 An overview of Gaudiya Vaishnavism – (gaudiya.com)
 An ecstatic ride across ancient spiritual Bengal: Nadia & Kalna Archives  
 Official statement by Vishwesha Tirtha on link between the line of Madhvacharya and Gaudiya Vaishnavism 
 Is Gaudiya Vaishnavism in the diksa line of Madhvacharya?

Official websites 
 

 
 
 
 
 
 
 

 
Anti-caste movements
Krishnaite Vaishnava denominations
Monotheistic religions
Religions that require vegetarianism
16th-century establishments in India
Bhakti movement